Leptognatha is a genus of beetles in the family Cicindelidae.

Containing the following species:

 Leptognatha alticola (Brouerius van Nidek, 1959) 
 Leptognatha bishopi Cassola, 1986 
 Leptognatha curvidentis Cassola, 1986 
 Leptognatha darlingtoni (Brouerius van Nidek, 1953) 
 Leptognatha denhoedi (Brouerius van Nidek, 1960) 
 Leptognatha fasciata Rivalier, 1972 
 Leptognatha flavoantennalis Cassola & Werner, 1998 
 Leptognatha fraudulenta Cassola, 1986 
 Leptognatha fuscilabris Rivalier, 1972
 Leptognatha gracilipes Rivalier, 1972 
 Leptognatha hornabrooki Cassola, 1986 
 Leptognatha inexpectata Cassola, 1986 
 Leptognatha latreillei (Guerin-Meneville, 1830) 
 Leptognatha longidentis Cassola, 1986 
 Leptognatha longipenis Cassola & Matalin, 2010
 Leptognatha nigrivestis (Brouerius van Nidek, 1959) 
 Leptognatha occidentalis Cassola, 1986 
 Leptognatha orientalis Rivalier, 1972 
 Leptognatha papua Cassola, 1986 
 Leptognatha pseudovelutina Cassola, 1986
 Leptognatha riedeliana Cassola & Werner, 1998 
 Leptognatha rivalieri (Brouerius van Nidek, 1960) 
 Leptognatha robusta Rivalier, 1972 
 Leptognatha rudolfbennigseni (W.Horn, 1912)
 Leptognatha sedlacekorum Cassola, 1986 
 Leptognatha septentrionalis Cassola, 1986 
 Leptognatha spinilabris Rivalier, 1972
 Leptognatha sumliniana Cassola, 1986 
 Leptognatha velutina (Brouerius van Nidek, 1959) 
 Leptognatha viridimicans (Brouerius van Nidek, 1959) 
 Leptognatha viridithoracica (Brouerius van Nidek, 1959) 
 Leptognatha wagneri (Mandl, 1970)

References

Cicindelidae